Pathum Thani is a town (thesaban mueang) in central Thailand, directly north of Bangkok. It is the capital of the Pathum Thani province, Thailand as well as the Mueang Pathum Thani district. As of 2005, it has a population of 18,320, covering the complete sub-district (tambon) Bang Parok.

Pathum Thani hosted the 4th APEC Youth Science Festival in 2011.

References

External links

Populated places in Pathum Thani province
Populated places on the Chao Phraya River